Nazem Sayad was a Lebanese footballer who played as an goalkeeper.

He played for Hilmi-Sport and Riada Wal Adab at club level, and Lebanon internationally. Sayad took part in Lebanon's first international match against Mandatory Palestine in 1940.

References

External links
 

Year of birth missing
Year of death missing
Sportspeople from Tripoli, Lebanon
Association football goalkeepers
Lebanese footballers
Lebanon international footballers
AS Hilmi-Sport players
Riada Wal Adab Club players
Lebanese Premier League players